Jocelyn Stevenson is a British-American writer and producer, largely for children's shows. She has received the BAFTA Special Award.

Screenwriting credits

Television
 Fraggle Rock (1983-1987)
 Sesame Street (1987-1989)
 Charlie Chalk (1988-1989)
 The Ghost of Faffner Hall (1989)
 Captain Zed and the Zee Zone (1991, 1993)
 Funnybones (1992)
 The Legend of Lochnagar (1993)
 Secret Life of Toys (1994)
 Jim Henson’s Animal Show (1994-1997)
 The Magic School Bus (1994-1997)
 Big Bag (1996)
 The Enchanted World of Brambly Hedge (1997-1998)
 Mopatop’s Shop (1999-2005)
 Construction Site (2002)
 Cyberchase (2002)
 Barney & Friends (2002-2006)
 Rubbadubbers (2003)
 What’s Your News? (2006-2008)
 The Magic School Bus Rides Again (2017)
 Fraggle Rock: Back to the Rock (2022)

Film
 The Tale of the Bunny Picnic (1986)
 Silent Mouse (1988)
 Faeries (1999)
 Moshi Monsters: The Movie (2013)
 The Magic School Bus Rides Again: In The Zone (2020)

References

External links 
 
 

Living people
Place of birth missing (living people)
BAFTA winners (people)
Year of birth missing (living people)